Michalina Stanisława Maciuszek (born 16 September 1963 in Moszczenica Wyżna) is a Polish former cross-country skier who competed from 1983 to 1994. At the 1994 Winter Olympics in Lillehammer, she had her best career finish of eighth in the 4 × 5 km relay and her best individual finish of 31st in the 30 km event.

Maciusek's best World Cup finish was 27th in a 15 km event in Italy in 1993. Her best individual career finish was sixth in 5 km FIS race in Poland in 1994.

Cross-country skiing results
All results are sourced from the International Ski Federation (FIS).

Olympic Games

World Cup

Season standings

References

External links
 
 
 Women's 4 x 5 km cross-country relay Olympic results: 1976-2002 

1963 births
Cross-country skiers at the 1994 Winter Olympics
Living people
Polish female cross-country skiers
Olympic cross-country skiers of Poland
People from Nowy Sącz County
Sportspeople from Lesser Poland Voivodeship